Macarostola tegulata is a moth of the family Gracillariidae. It is known from Meghalaya, India.

The head of this species is whitish, sides of face crimson-pink, crown partially yellow suffused, collar crimson-pink. Palpi smooth scaled, crimson-pink, terminal joint and apex of second white. Antennae ochreous-whitish. Thorax crimson, posteriorly yellow with a crimson spot.

References

Macarostola
Moths of Asia
Moths described in 1908